Kevin Korozmán (born 2 March 1997) is a Hungarian footballer who plays as forward for Soroksár SC in Nemzeti Bajnokság II.

References 

1997 births
Living people
Hungarian footballers
Association football forwards
Nemzeti Bajnokság I players
Nemzeti Bajnokság II players
Ferencvárosi TC footballers
MTK Budapest FC players
Soroksár SC players